David John Novak (born 1961) is a United States district judge for the United States District Court for the Eastern District of Virginia and a former  United States magistrate judge of the same court.

Education 

Novak received his Bachelor of Arts, magna cum laude, from Saint Vincent College in 1983 and his Juris Doctor from Villanova University School of Law in 1986.

Legal career 

Novak has served in multiple positions at the United States Department of Justice, including serving as an Assistant United States Attorney in the Southern District of Texas from 1991 to 1994 and as a Trial Attorney in the Criminal Division. He later served 18 years as an Assistant United States Attorney in the Eastern District of Virginia, including as Chief of the Criminal Division and as Senior Litigation Counsel.

Federal judicial service

Failed nomination for district court under Bush 

On November 15, 2007, President George W. Bush nominated Novak to serve as a Judge on the United States District Court for the Eastern District of Virginia to the seat vacated by Robert E. Payne who assumed senior status on May 7, 2007. A hearing on his nomination was held on April 3, 2008. The Senate never acted on the nomination.

United States Magistrate Judge 

In 2012 he was selected to be a United States magistrate judge for the United States District Court for the Eastern District of Virginia and served as one until his elevation as a Federal District Judge.

Renomination to district court under Trump 

On March 15, 2019, President Donald Trump announced his intent to nominate Novak to serve as a United States district judge for the United States District Court for the Eastern District of Virginia. On March 26, 2019, his nomination was sent to the Senate. Novak was nominated to the seat vacated by Judge Henry E. Hudson, who assumed senior status on June 1, 2018. On April 30, 2019, a hearing on his nomination was held before the Senate Judiciary Committee. On June 13, 2019, his nomination was reported out of committee by a 19–3 vote. On October 16, 2019, the United States Senate invoked cloture on his nomination by a 86–4 vote. His nomination was confirmed later that day by a 89–3 vote. He received his judicial commission on October 17, 2019.

References

External links 
 

1961 births
Living people
20th-century American lawyers
21st-century American lawyers
21st-century American judges
Assistant United States Attorneys
Judges of the United States District Court for the Eastern District of Virginia
People from Greensburg, Pennsylvania
Saint Vincent College alumni
United States Department of Justice lawyers
United States magistrate judges
United States district court judges appointed by Donald Trump
Villanova University School of Law alumni